Jai Hindley (born 5 May 1996) is an Australian professional cyclist who currently rides for UCI WorldTeam .

Career
In August 2018, he was named in the startlist for the Vuelta a España. In May 2019, he was named in the startlist for the 2019 Giro d'Italia.

Hindley started the 2020 season well by winning two stages and the general classification in the Herald Sun Tour in February. He started the Giro d'Italia in October. He moved up to third place on the general classification after finishing third on Stage 15. He won stage 18 which was considered the "Queen stage" crossing the Stelvio Pass. He moved up to second place overall after the stage and also took the lead in the young riders classification. He finished second to Tao Geoghegan Hart on the mountainous stage 20 to move into the overall lead with the same time as Geoghegan Hart. The final stage of the Giro was a 15.7 kilometre time trial. Hindley finished with a time 39 seconds slower than Geoghegan Hart, which meant Hindley finished the Giro in second place overall.

Hindley withdrew from the 2021 Giro d'Italia prior to the start of stage 14. At the time he was in 25th place more than +17:00 off the lead.

Hindley moved to the  team for the 2022 season. Early in the season he managed a top 5 finish in the 2022 Tirreno–Adriatico. Two months later he won his first Grand Tour, the Giro d'Italia. Hindley rode strongly during the first two weeks of the race and won stage 9, a high mountain stage. For the majority of the third week he stood in 2nd place, just a few seconds behind Richard Carapaz. On the penultimate mountain stage he was able to drop all of the GC contenders including Carapaz and ride himself into the lead with a comfortable margin going into the final ITT. For the second time in his career he rode the final ITT of the Giro d'Italia while wearing the Maglia Rosa, but this time he seized the moment and won the race. He is the first Australian to win the Giro and just the second Australian to win a grand tour, following Cadel Evans who won the Tour de France.

Major results

2013
 Oceania Junior Road Championships
2nd  Road race
10th Time trial
2014
 3rd  Road race, Oceania Junior Road Championships
 3rd Road race, National Junior Road Championships
2015
 10th Time trial, Oceania Under-23 Road Championships
2016
 1st GP Capodarco
 2nd Overall An Post Rás
1st  Young rider classification
 2nd Taiwan KOM Challenge
 5th Overall Tour de l'Avenir
 6th Flèche Ardennaise
2017
 1st  Overall Toscana-Terra di Ciclismo
1st Mountains classification
1st Stage 1a (TTT)
 1st  Overall Tour of Fuzhou
1st Stage 4
 2nd Overall Herald Sun Tour
1st  Young rider classification
 2nd Trofeo Città di San Vendemiano
 3rd  Road race, Oceania Road Championships
 3rd Overall Giro Ciclistico d'Italia
1st Stage 7
 4th Overall Rhône-Alpes Isère Tour
 4th Gran Premio Industrie del Marmo
 9th Overall Tour Alsace
 10th Overall Tour de l'Avenir
 10th Gran Premio Palio del Recioto
2019
 2nd Overall Tour de Pologne
2020
 1st  Overall Herald Sun Tour
1st  Mountains classification
1st Stages 2 & 4
 2nd Overall Giro d'Italia
1st Stage 18
Held  after Stage 20
Held  after Stages 18–20
2021
 7th Overall Tour de Pologne
2022
 1st  Overall Giro d'Italia
1st Stage 9
 5th Overall Tirreno–Adriatico
 6th Clásica Jaén Paraíso Interior
 7th Overall Vuelta a Burgos
 10th Overall Vuelta a España

General classification results timeline

References

External links

1996 births
Living people
Australian Giro d'Italia stage winners
Australian male cyclists
Cyclists from Perth, Western Australia
Giro d'Italia winners
20th-century Australian people
21st-century Australian people